Jamník is a village and municipality in Liptovský Mikuláš District in the Žilina Region of northern Slovakia.

Etymology
Archaic Slovak jamník - a navvy. In this case probably meaning "a miner".

History
In historical records the village was first mentioned in 1346 (Yemnik).

Geography
The municipality lies at an altitude of 695 metres and covers an area of 45.616 km². It has a population of about 410 people.

Genealogical resources

The records for genealogical research are available at the state archive "Statny Archiv in Bytca, Slovakia"

 Roman Catholic church records (births/marriages/deaths): 1698-1951 (parish B)
 Lutheran church records (births/marriages/deaths): 1784-1926 (parish B)

See also
 List of municipalities and towns in Slovakia

References

External links
https://web.archive.org/web/20071027094149/http://www.statistics.sk/mosmis/eng/run.html
 Village website (in Slovak)
Surnames of living people in Jamnik

Villages and municipalities in Liptovský Mikuláš District